Annabella Mary Geddes (19 May 1864–5 December 1955) was a New Zealand welfare worker and community leader. Of Māori descent, she identified with the Nga Puhi iwi. She was born in Mangungu, Northland, New Zealand on 19 May 1864.

References

1864 births
1955 deaths
New Zealand social workers
People from the Northland Region
Ngāpuhi people